Yuwen Qidegui (pinyin: Yǔwén Qǐdeguī) (?–333) chieftain of the Yuwen tribe (early 4th century – 333). He succeeded his father Yuwen Xunniyan as chieftain. 

In 325, Later Zhao ruler Shi Le added Yuwen Qidegui 官爵, Yuwen Qidegui dispatched troops to assist Shi Le in attacking Xianbei chieftain Murong Hui. Murong Hui then dispatched his heir apparent Murong Huang along with the Tuoba and the Duan tribes. Murong Hui entered as the right wing, Murong Ren was left wing. Qidegui guarded the river (now Xar moron River). Yuwen Qidegui's nephew Yuwen Xibaxiong resisted Murong Ren in addition. Murong Ren killed Yuwen Xibaxiong, while winning attacks against Yuwen Qidegui with Murong Huang, breaking Yuwen Qidegui's forces. Yuwen Qidegui abandoned his armed force to run away, Murong Huang and Murong Ren entered his territory and sent troops to pursue Yuwen Qidegui. In 333 he was killed by Yuwen Yidougui, who succeeded him as chieftain of the Yuwen.

References 

 Zizhi Tongjian, vol. 17, part 19.
 ''Book of Wei, vol. 91.

Ancient peoples of China
Chieftains of the Yuwen clan
333 deaths